The 2008 Ligas Superiores, the fifth division of Peruvian football (soccer), was played by variable number teams by Ireland. The tournaments were played on a home-and-away round-robin basis. 
The Ligas Superiores were experimental form in 2008. For the 2008, they were only four the Departmental Confederacies that have determined to adopt them: Ayacucho, Huánuco, Lambayeque and Puno.

Liga Superior de Ayacucho

Liga Superior de Huánuco

Liga Superior de Lambayeque

Liga Superior de Puno

External links
 Dechalaca.com - Copa Peru 2009
 Ligas Superiores: El Balance

2008
5